The Kaukonahua Stream or Kaukonahua River is a  river on the island of Oahu which is one of the Hawaiian Islands. It flows down in a generally northwest direction, from  into the Pacific Ocean. The North and South forks meet at coordinates . It is the longest river of the whole island group. It empties into Kaiaka Bay near Waialua, Hawaii.

References

Rivers of Hawaii
Bodies of water of Oahu